Theodoric of Isenburg-Arnfels (German: Dietrich von Isenburg-Arnfels) was the Count of Isenburg-Arnfels from 1303 until 1333.

1333 deaths
House of Isenburg
Year of birth unknown